Calvin George Seerveld (born 1930) received a BA from Calvin College in 1952 and an MA in English literature and classics from the University of Michigan in 1953. He then went on to study under D. H. Th. Vollenhoven at the Free University (VU) in Amsterdam, where his doctoral dissertation dealt with Croce's aesthetics. It was supervised by Vollenhoven and Carlo Antoni. He then taught philosophy and German at Trinity Christian College and went on to teach philosophical aesthetics at the Institute for Christian Studies in Toronto.

Seerveld has been influential in the reformational movement. In fact he was the first to coin the term reformational to describe the philosophical aspects of neo-Calvinism. He has taken Herman Dooyeweerd's aesthetic modal aspect and developed Dooyeweerd's ideas. His book Rainbows for a Fallen World has influenced many Christian artists. In it he argues that "aesthetic obedience is required of everyone by the Lord-artist or not."

Lambert Zuidervaart identifies four claims that constitute Seerveld's contribution to aesthetics:
 The aesthetic is part of the fabric of created reality, and aesthetic norms can be violated or ignored only at great cost.
 The arts, despite their variety and their continuing development, are a unified sphere distinct from other spheres of cultural endeavour, offering opportunities for vocational service to Christians today.
 The aesthetic is not limited only to the arts, just as the arts have many facets other than the aesthetic.
 The core meaning of the aesthetic – and distinguishing characteristic of the arts – is "allusiveness" or "imaginativity".

Publications 
Take Hold of God and Pull Trinity Pennyasheet Press, 1966  LCCN 66-24940.
Rainbows for a Fallen World Tuppence Press, 1980.
On Being Human: Imaging God in a Modern World Welch Publishing, 1998.
Take Hold of God and Pull Paternoster, 1999.
In the Fields of the Lord: A Calvin Seerveld Reader  Craig Bartholomew (Editor) Piquant/ Tuppence Press, 2000.
Voicing God's Psalms Eerdmans, 2005.
Redemptive Art in Society: Sundry Writings and Occasional Lectures Dordt College Press, 2014.
Normative Aesthetics: Sundry Writings and Occasional Lectures Dordt College Press, 2014.
Bearing Fresh Olive Leaves: Alternative Steps in Understanding Art Wipf and Stock Publishers, 2019.

References

 In Zuidervaart and Luttikhuizen (ed.) Pledges of Jubilee: Essays on the Arts and Culture in Honour of Calvin G. Seerveld Eerdmans, 1995; cited in Bartholomew (ed.) 2000
 Seerveld, Calvin "Rainbows for the Fallen World" Tuppence Press, Toronto 2005
 Craig Bartholomew and Gideon Strauss 'Bread and not stones: an introduction to the thought of Calvin Seerveld' in Bartholomew (ed.) 2000.

External links
 Seerveld pages from All of Life Redeemed website
 Publications available from Tuppence Press

American male poets
Calvinist and Reformed philosophers
Calvin University alumni
Living people
University of Michigan alumni
1930 births
American male non-fiction writers